MacLeod Baker Ochola (b. 1936; also Macleod or Macleord) is an Anglican bishop in Uganda: he was the inaugural  Bishop of Kitgum, serving from 1995 until 2002.

Ochola was educated at Uganda Christian University and ordained deacon in 1969, and priest in 1972. He has served in the Dioceses of Northern Uganda and Boga-Zaire.

References

Anglican bishops of Kitgum
21st-century Anglican bishops in Uganda
20th-century Anglican bishops in Uganda
1936 births
Uganda Christian University alumni
Living people